postmarketOS (abbreviated as pmOS) is an operating system primarily for smartphones, based on the Alpine Linux distribution.

postmarketOS was launched on 26 May 2017 with the source code available on GitHub before migrating to GitLab in 2018. It is capable of running different X and Wayland based user interfaces, such as Plasma Mobile, MATE, GNOME 3, and XFCE; later updates added support for Unity8 and Phosh. It is also capable of running Docker, if the device specific kernel has cgroups and relevant configs enabled. The project aims to provide a ten-year lifecycle for smartphones.

Architecture 
Unlike many other projects porting conventional Linux distributions to Android phones, postmarketOS does not use the Android build system or userspace. Each phone has only one unique package, and flashable installation images are generated using the pmbootstrap tool. The project intends to support the mainline Linux kernel on all phones in the future, instead of the often outdated Android-specific fork, to reduce the potential for security exploits. A few devices can boot into the mainline kernel already. The project aims to support Android apps, originally through the use of Anbox, which was replaced by Waydroid since postmarketOS v21.12.

Alpine Linux was chosen as the base distribution due to its low storage requirements, making it more suitable for older devices. Excluding the kernel, a base installation takes up approximately 6 MB.

State of development

Features 
Different tools have been published by the project, including:
 pmbootstrap, a utility to help the process of development with cross compilation;
 osk-sdl, a virtual keyboard to allow decryption of a password during startup (on a device with full disk encryption);
 charging-sdl, an application contained in the initramfs to display an animation when the phone is charging while off.

Device support 
As of May 2020, over two hundred devices are able to boot the operating system, including 92 with WiFi support. This includes many smartphones and tablets that originally ran Android, as well as some Linux-based Nokia smartphones, such as the N900 and N9. After Corellium's Project Sandcastle ported the Linux kernel to some iPhone versions, postmarketOS was also seen to boot on it, although no persistent flashing is supported at the moment. As of May 2021, support for wearable devices (including Google Glass and smartwatches like the LG G Watch) has been improved through integration with the AsteroidOS user interface and work on mainline kernel for the LG G Watch R.

In 2018, no devices were yet able to make phone calls with postmarketOS, although significant efforts were being made in this regard. By 2020, a number of devices were fully or mostly supported, including for phone calls, SMS messages and mobile data. These included the BQ Aquaris X5, Librem 5, Nokia N900, Motorola Moto G4 Play, Samsung Galaxy A3 (2015), Samsung Galaxy A5 (2015), and Wileyfox Swift.

Furthermore, the device was launched as a first-party operating system for the PinePhone, with the postmarketOS Community Edition.

Porting to a new device 
The development process to make a new device compatible with the operating system consists of creating a phone-specific package using the pmbootstrap tool. For that, the use of the Linux kernel from the device's original manufacturer is often necessary. The source code of the original kernel is often made available by compliance with the requirements of the GPLv2 license, but some drivers necessary for the operation of the device may not be available, and must, therefore, be recreated. Examples include GPU drivers such as Lima, which has a proprietary equivalent in userspace on Android that is not subject to the GPLv2 requirements.

Gallery

See also 

 List of open-source mobile phones
 Librem 5
 PinePhone
 Android rooting
 Comparison of mobile operating systems
 LineageOS
 Replicant
 Ubuntu Touch
 Sailfish OS
 LuneOS
 Maemo
 Plasma Mobile

References

External links 

 
 Source code on GitLab

Embedded Linux distributions
Free mobile software
Linux distributions without systemd
Linux distributions
Mobile Linux
Software forks